"Hot Town" is a song by Australian musician Jon English. The song was released in October 1979 as the first single from his sixth studio album, Calm Before the Storm.

Track listing
 Australian 7" Single (Mercury – 6037 952)
Side A "Hot Town"	
Side B "Show No Weakness"

 International 7" Single (Mercury - 6038 002)
Side A "Hot Town"
Side B "Give It a Try"

Charts

References

Jon English songs
1979 songs
1979 singles
Mercury Records singles